Landsborough may refer to:

People
Charlie Landsborough (born 1941), English country and folk musician and singer
William Landsborough (1825–1886), Australian explorer and member of the Queensland Legislative Council

Places
 Landsborough, Queensland in the Sunshine coast region of Australia
 Landsborough railway station
 Landsborough, Victoria in the Shire of Pyrenees in Australia
 Landsborough County cadastral region in New South Wales, Australia
 Landsborough Highway in western Queensland, Australia
 Shire of Landsborough (1912–1987), Australian local government area now known as City of Caloundra
 Landsborough River, in the South Island of New Zealand.